Golam Rahman Shah is a Bangladesh Awami League politician and the former Member of Parliament of Dinajpur-6.

Career
Shah was elected to parliament from Dinajpur-6 as a Bangladesh Awami League candidate in 1979.

References

Awami League politicians
Living people
2nd Jatiya Sangsad members
Year of birth missing (living people)